Arthur Solomon Kyobe (born 29 November 1988 in Lira, Uganda) is a Ugandan cricketer who played in the 2006 U-19 Cricket World Cup in Sri Lanka.  He has also played first-class, one-day and Twenty20 cricket for his country. In July 2019, he was one of twenty-five players named in the Ugandan training squad, ahead of the Cricket World Cup Challenge League fixtures in Hong Kong.

References

1988 births
Living people
Ugandan cricketers
People from Lira District